John Moore (died by 28 January 1572) was an English politician.

He was a Member (MP) of the Parliament of England for Leominster in 1563.

References

Year of birth missing
Year of death missing
English MPs 1563–1567
People from Leominster